Cochylis maestana is a species of moth of the family Tortricidae. It is found in northern Iran (Elburz Mountains, Shahkuh, Takht-e Soleymān), eastern Afghanistan and eastern Asia Minor.

References

Moths described in 1899
Cochylis